Roopal Patel is an Indian American luxury fashion consultant.

Early life 

Roopal Patel was born in United States to Indian parents. Both her parents are immigrants. Her father is a doctor.

Career 
Roopal Patel reports to Tracy Margolies, the chief merchant at Saks Fifth Avenue. Roopal was recently appointed as the Fashion Director at Saks Fifth Avenue. Roopal resigned as Senior Fashion Director at Neiman Marcus. She started her own luxury fashion consulting company in 2012  Now, one of her many clients is the [[Council of Fashion Designers of America#CFDA {FASHION INCUBATOR} program|CFDA {FASHION INCUBATOR} program]].
She was also a market editor at style.com. Roopal has been an advocate of bright colors in the fashion industry.

References

External links 
 Official Website

American people of Indian descent
American businesspeople
Living people
Year of birth missing (living people)
21st-century American women